Former constellations are old historical Western constellations that for various reasons are no longer widely recognised or are not officially recognised by the International Astronomical Union (IAU). Prior to 1930, many of these defunct constellations were traditional in one or more countries or cultures. Some only lasted decades but others were referred to over many centuries. All are now recognised only for having classical or historical value. Many former constellations had complex Latinised names after objects, people, or mythological or zoological creatures. Others with unwieldy names were shortened for convenience. For example, Scutum Sobiescianum was reduced to Scutum, Mons Mensae to Mensa, and Apparatus Sculptoris to Sculptor.

Some of the Northern Sky's former constellations were placed in the less populated regions between the traditional brighter constellations just to fill gaps. In the Southern Sky, new constellations were often created from about the 15th century by voyagers who began journeying south of the Equator. European countries like England, France, the Netherlands, German or Italian states, etc., often supported and popularised their own constellation outlines. In some cases, different constellations occupied overlapping areas and included the same stars. These former constellations are often found in older books, star charts, or star catalogues. 

The 88 modern constellation names and boundaries were standardised by Eugene Delporte for the IAU in 1930, under an international agreement, removing any possible astronomical ambiguities between astronomers from different countries. Nearly all former or defunct constellations differ in their designated boundaries in as much as they have outlines that do not follow the exact lines of right ascension and declination.

Noteworthy former constellations

Argo Navis
Argo Navis is the only constellation from Ptolemy's original list of 48 constellations that is no longer officially recognized.  Due to its large size, it was split into three constellations by Nicolas Louis de Lacaille: Carina (the keel), Puppis (the poop deck), and Vela (the sails). The new constellations were introduced in the 1763 star catalog Coelum Australe Stelliferum, which was published soon after de Lacaille's death.

Quadrans Muralis
Quadrans Muralis was originally created in 1795, placed in the northern skies between the still-accepted constellations Boötes and Draco.  The Quadrantids meteor shower is named after this former constellation.

Remnant nomenclature
53 Eridani retains the name Sceptrum from the former constellation Sceptrum Brandenburgicum.

List of former constellations

See also

Asterism
Lists of constellations
Julius Schiller's Coelum Stellatum Christianum (1627, "Christian Starry Sky") renamed the pagan constellations with new names after Christian figures.

References

Further reading
Allen, Richard Hinckley (1963). Star Names: Their Lore and Meaning New York: Dover. (Original work published 1899)
Nick Kanas. Star Maps: History, Artistry, and Cartography. Springer; 5 June 2012. .

External links
 Former Constellations
 Obsolete Constellations
 Felice Stoppa: Le costellazioni scomparse dal cielo 
 Les Constellations Disparues